Barpali is a small town and a block ( Tehsil) within the Bargarh district in the state of Odisha, India. Barpali is largely famous for renowned Odia Poet Swabhaba Kabi Gangadhar Meher who was born here. However,  there are several other cultural notations which have made Barpali famous nationally and internationally,  like:  the indigenous sambalpuri saree weaving art (Ikat design) and the earthen pottery handicrafts (Terracotta) etc, creations from the native inhabitants of Barpali. Among others, the name Barpali also draws attention towards the past studies, wide usage and then outward expansion of preliminary versions of sanitary toilets started by foreigners here, known as 'Barpali Toilets' nearly 40 years ago.

Barpali comes under the Bijepur Vidhan Sabha (State Assembly Electoral Constituency) in Odisha state and is under the Bargarh Lok Sabha constituency (Parliamentary Electoral constituency) in India.

Location 
The geo-coordinates for Barpali is 21.1813° N, 83.5976° E, which is situated at a height of 182 m (597 ft) from sea level.

Barpali lies in a major routes between Bargarh to Borigumma (NH)
& Raipur -Puri Road

Demographics 
 India census, Barpali had a population of 19,154. Males constitute approximately 51% of the population and females 49%. Barpali has an average literacy rate of 68.5%, with 59% of the males and 41% of females literate. The majority of the population is depend on agriculture. Around 11% of the total population is under 6 years of age. The electoral jurisdiction of Barpali comes under the Bijepur constituency of Odisha state Assembly and the parliamentary (central) electoral jurisdiction is under the Bargarh lok sabha constituency. Notably, the Barpali Block consists of 23 Panchayats which has total 57 villages.

Religious culture 
 
 There are a number of temples (>30) in and around the town including the famous Ashtashambu (A sacred presence of eight different temples of Lord Shiva).
 Sital-Shasthee is an important festival among several others that must be placed here. This festival which marks the auspicious marriage of Lord Shiva and Goddess Parvati, has completed apparently more than thousand of years according to folklore. 
 Dussehra is observed in Barpali, Durga Puja and Navaratri is celebrated by the people and the Ravan Dahan is also carried out here. The organising committee of the Durga Puja and Navaratri term it that it started in 1877.
Kali Puja is a major festival here

Educational institutions 
Apart from a number of primary schools in the town, some notable schools are listed below including a rare few, whose establishments date back to more than a century:
 Modern Public School (Estd 1986)
 Girls Primary School (Estd 1884)
 Boys Primary School (Estd 1910)
 Hatpada Primary School (Estd 1953)
 Samaleswari UG.UPS school (Estd 1959)
 Gangadhar Project UG.UP School (Estd 1978)
 Saraswati Shishu Mandir (Estd 1990) 
 Little Angels Public School (Estd 2000)
Barpali town is also native to some of the renowned Government high schools as:

 Government Boys' High School (Estd 1944)
 Government Girls' High School (Estd 1964)
 Gangadhar NAC High School (Estd 1975)
There are undergraduate and post-graduate institutions are also located in the town itself, e.g. 

Barapali College, Barpali
 The Pharmaceutical College, Barpali (Estd 1986)
 Women's Junior college Barpali

References

Remta
Cities and towns in Bargarh district